In 1959, radio and television personality and television producer Dick Clark organized and produced a concert tour of rock and roll and rhythm and blues artists, many of whom had appeared on his music performance and dance television program, American Bandstand. The show was billed as Dick Clark's Caravan of Stars. Its success prompted additional tours. The last of the concerts toured in 1966.

Origin and structure

Dick Clark observed that in the late 1950s, rock and roll had little acceptance as a form of live entertainment. Seeing an opportunity, he formed the Caravan of Stars, which, during its seven-year existence grew to gross nearly $5 million annually (more than $45 million in 2021 dollars).

The concert promoted up to seventeen acts, each performing two or three songs, all backed by the same band. In the beginning, admission was $1.50 ($13.50 in 2021). By 1965 the price had risen to $2.50 ($22.50 in 2021).

The summer tour went out from Memorial Day to Labor Day, sixty to ninety days on the road, nonstop.  Tours were added throughout the other seasons.

Headliners

The show always spotlighted a major artist, who closed the show, like Bobby Vee or Paul Anka.

Other artists included Freddie Cannon, Brian Hyland, Little Eva, Lloyd Price, Linda Scott, and Johnny Tillotson.

Groups included The Coasters, The Crystals, The Drifters, The Skyliners, and The Supremes.

Reception

The August 30, 1959, concert at the Hollywood Bowl in Hollywood, California, reflected the early success of the Caravan. The performance set an all-time attendance record at the Bowl, with more than 5,000 being turned away. Variety reported that police set up loudspeakers six blocks away to tell people the show was sold out.

A week later, at the Michigan State Fair, the show set another attendance record, surpassing the previous attendance record by more than 15,000 concert goers over the previous record in the 110-year history of the fair.

Legacy

In 1978, in a commemorative piece on the 25th anniversary of the birth of rock and roll, Clark recalled the Caravan days, commenting that today's artists:

Rosters

Except where noted, the following lineups are taken from concert posters promoting the Caravan in various cities throughout the United States. The popularity of the shows led to the production of multiple units traveling the country.

August 1959 

Frankie Avalon
Annette 
Anita Bryant
Dodie Stevens
Skip & Flip
The Strangers
Duane Eddy
Freddie Cannon
Jan and Dean
Bobby Rydell
Jack Scott
Ray Sharpe
Jerry Wallace
The Young Lions

October 1959 (Canton, Ohio)

Paul Anka
Lloyd Price
Annette
Duane Eddy
Jimmy Clanton
LaVern Baker
The Coasters
The Drifters
The Skyliners
Bobby Rydell
The Jordan Brothers
Phil Phillips
Lloyd Price and His Caravan of Stars Orch

Spring 1961 

Jan & Dean
Freddie Cannon
Johnny Burnette
Gary (U.S.) Bonds
Danny & The Juniors
The Earls
The Fabulous Four
The Five Satins
The Four Sportsmen
Dick Lee
Bobby Lewis
Little Caesar & The Romans
The Mello Kings
The Miller Sisters
The Olympics
The Doc Bagby Big Beat Orch

Summer 1961

Chubby Checker
Jan & Dean
Bobby Rydell
Freddie Cannon
Frankie Avalon
Mike Clifford
Gary (U.S.) Bonds
The Shirelles
Johnny & The Hurricanes
Chuck Jackson
Dodie Stevens
Bobby Lewis
JoAnn Campbell

Fall 1961 (Milwaukee)

Paul Anka
Chubby Checker
Linda Scott
Duane Eddy
Clarence “Frogman” Henry
The Shirelles
The Jive Five
The Caravan of Stars Orch

Fall 1963 

Bobby Vee
Brian Hyland
Jimmy Clanton
Linda Scott
The Essex
The Jaynettes
The Ronettes
Little Eva
The Dixie Belles
Dale & Grace
Joe Perkins
Donald Jenkins & The Delighters
The Dovells
Paul & Paula
The Tymes
Jeff Condon
Myron Lee & His Orch

Summer 1964

Gene Pitney
The Dixie Cups
Dean & Jean
Mike Clifford
The Rip Chords
The Coasters
Brenda Holloway
The Crystals
Brian Hyland
The Kasuals
Major Lance
George McCannon
The Reflections
Round Robin
The Shirelles
The Supremes

Fall 1964 (Conneaut Lake Park, Pennsylvania)

Gene Pitney
Bobby Rydell
Paul Anka
Neil Sedaka
Sue Thompson
Sam Cook
The Crystals
Del Shannon
Connie Francis
Ral Donner
The Teddy Bears
Buzz Clifford
Johnny Preston
Gene Chandler
Conway Twitty

Fall 1964 (Worcester, Massachusetts)

Johnny Tillotson
The Drifters
The Supremes
Brian Hyland
Bobby Freeman
The Hondells
The Crystals
Dee Dee Sharp
Sonny Knight
Mike Clifford
The Velvelettes
Lou Christie
Jimmy Ford & The Chicago Casuals
Little Al Guitar

April 1965 

The Shangri-Las
The Larks
The Hondells
Dion
Dee Dee Sharp
Reparata & The Delrons
Mel Carter
Mickey Rooney, Jr.

April 1965 

Bobby Goldsboro
Gene Pitney
Tim Tormey
Chad and Jeremy
Vic Dana
Bill Black's Combo
The Reasons
Darin D’Anna
Gary Lewis & The Playboys
The Crystals
The Reflections
The Rag Dolls
Brian Hyland
Ronnie Cochran
Susan Wayne

May 1965 (Bluefield, West Virginia)

Bobby Vee
Herman's Hermits
Little Anthony & The Imperials
The Ikettes
Freddie Cannon
Bobby Freeman
Brenda Holloway
The Detergents
Round Robin
The Hondells
Reparata & The Delrons
Billy Stewart
George McCannon III
Myron Lee & The Caddies
Little Jr. Mann

August 1965 (Conneaut Lake, Pennsylvania)

Peter & Gordon
Tom Jones
The Shirelles
Them
Ronnie Dove
Mel Carter
Brian Hyland
Billy Joe Royal
George McCannon
Jimmy Rice
Jimmy Ford's Executives
Timothy Wilson

November 1965

Paul Revere & The Raiders
The Byrds
The We Five
Bo Diddley
The Dutchess
Dale Wright & The Wright Guys
Men of Action
The Results
The Rolling Stones (Pittsburgh only)

August 1966
 
The Happenings
Mitch Ryder
Capitols
Strangeloves
Thomas Group
Keith Allison
Dean Parrish
Cash McCall
Lou Christie

October 1966

Gary Lewis & The Playboys
Sam the Sham & The Pharaohs
The Yardbirds
Distant Cousins
Bobby Hebb
Brian Hyland

References

Concert tours of the United States